James Aloysius Power became the Mayor of Waterford in 1903. He thereafter received his knighthood on 2 May 1904 at Waterford's South Railway Station from King Edward VII who had traveled from Dún Laoghaire to Waterford North Station which had been decked out in crimson.  HMS Aeolous fired a salute and Power hosted the King at a City Hall reception.  Power was knighted just before the King left on the train station platform.

References 

Mayors of Waterford
Year of birth missing
Year of death missing
Knights Bachelor